WACP (channel 4) is a religious television station licensed to Atlantic City, New Jersey, United States, serving southern New Jersey and the Philadelphia television market as an owned-and-operated station of Tri-State Christian Television (TCT). The station's studios are located in Millville, and its transmitter is located in Waterford Works.

History
On December 17, 2009, the FCC proposed the allotment of two VHF allocations: one on channel 4 to Atlantic City, New Jersey, and another on channel 5 to Seaford, Delaware. On January 13, 2011, the FCC announced a license auction for February 15 of that year for the two VHF channel allocations. On February 26, 2011, Richland Towers-created Western Pacific Broadcast LLC won the federal auction to acquire the two full-power VHF station licenses. On May 4, 2011, the FCC granted Western Pacific Broadcast a construction permit to build a digital transmitter for the new station, using the channel 4 license. On June 23, 2011, an application was filed into the FCC to assign the "WACP" callsign to the station license. The construction permit to build the WACP transmitter was approved by the Federal Communications Commission on February 13, 2012.

On April 18, 2012, Richland Towers Management Waterford purchased an existing transmitter tower in Waterford Works, New Jersey (located at 1813 Arrowhead Drive) from Univision Communications, who acquired the site on May 15, 2002, as part of that company's acquisition of USA Broadcasting's television stations, including Philadelphia's WUVP-TV (channel 65). On or around June 6, 2012, WACP began testing its broadcast signal by running a tower camera feed from Birmingham, Alabama CBS affiliate WIAT, along with a WACP station ID on the upper right portion of the screen; this was later replaced by a full-screen station ID that began to be shown on-air on June 24, 2012. The FCC granted the WACP station license on July 9, 2012.

On October 23, 2012, Comcast Xfinity added WACP on cable channel 4 in much of its Philadelphia service area, displacing ABC owned-and-operated station WPVI-TV to Comcast channel 6 (in correspondence with the station's virtual channel) in certain areas (though the reasoning for WPVI maintaining the cable channel 4 location, to prevent co-channel interference with the station's signal, was no longer an issue after improvements to the cable system in the 1990s).

WACP's programming featured a mix of infomercials, home shopping shows and children's programming following E/I requirements outlined by the Federal Communications Commission (FCC). The station carried local newscasts that were produced by Millville-based SNJ Today from 2015 until 2019. The newscasts were maintained largely by the former staff of WMGM-TV's news department. WMGM and WACP simulcast the newscasts until the former announced its sale to Univision in 2017.

On July 1, 2019, WACP began to simulcast News 12 New Jersey from 6 to 9 a.m. on weekdays.

On August 31, 2021, Marion, Illinois–based Tri-State Christian Television announced that it would purchase WACP for $10 million. The sale was completed on November 1.

Subchannels
The station's digital signal is multiplexed:

References

External links 
TCT official website
RabbitEars.Info -- Digital TV Market Listing for WACP - Facility ID 189358
RabbitEars.Info -- WACP ATLANTIC CITY, NJ - Facility ID 189358
Richland Towers website

Tri-State Christian Television affiliates
Heartland (TV network) affiliates
ACP
ACP
ACP
Television channels and stations established in 2012
2012 establishments in New Jersey